Center Township is the name of some places in the U.S. state of Pennsylvania:
Center Township, Beaver County, Pennsylvania
Center Township, Butler County, Pennsylvania
Center Township, Greene County, Pennsylvania
Center Township, Indiana County, Pennsylvania
Center Township, Snyder County, Pennsylvania

See also:
Centre Township, Pennsylvania (disambiguation)

Pennsylvania township disambiguation pages